George Webster (born 28 July 1991) is an English actor who is best known for his lead as Milo in E4's British  mini-series Tripped (2015), his supporting role as Arden in the Irish independent film My Name Is Emily (2015) and Simon Mirren's French-Canadian period series, Versailles (2017). He has also directed two films: the short film The Punisher: Dead of Night (2012) and the British comedy Further Ed (2017).

Career
After starting out studying film making and directing various short films, he made the transition into acting and has since been seen in Jamie Patterson's City of Dreamers (2012) and Danny Boyle's series Babylon (2014) and the ITV series Autopsy: The Last Hours Of as the late River Phoenix  before landing his first major role in Simon Fitzmaurice's My Name Is Emily in September 2014. Soon after, he was cast as a lead in E4's sci-fi comedy TV mini-series Tripped opposite Blake Harrison. In late 2015, he joined the cast of Simon Mirren's series Versailles as Prince William III of Orange and worked with Ron Howard on the National Geographic series Genius where he played the recurring role of Julius Winteler.

Filmography

Film

Television

Writing credits

References

External links

1991 births
English male actors
British directors
Living people